Adeck Akah Mba (born March 4, 1979) is a professional Cameroonian  footballer, who currently plays for Hapoel Acre F.C.

Biography
Adeck was born and brought up in Batibo where football was very much discouraged by many parents. It was considered by many parents as a game for lazy people but his parents were understanding enough to let him choose his own career. He played for his school teams as a youngster and showed tremendous promise as a brilliant footballer.

Career
In the season 1998/1999 with Cotonsport Garoua, he played 32 matches, scoring 5 goals and gave 10 assists. His game was very much loved by BFC Dynamo fans who gave him the nickname "Fußball gott", meaning "Football god". From 2000 to 2004, he played 89 matches and scored 27 goals in Germany. He played in 2005 for Canon Yaoundé and was the captain.[2] In July 2007 he left Canon Yaoundé and move to Israeli club Hapoel Acre F.C. He played for Hapoel Akko for four years scoring 22 goals in 107. He was the Play maker of the team. In August 2011, he signed a four months contract with AC Kajaani. He was instrumental in the qualification of AC Kajaani to Kokkanen. He scored four goals in a game for the first time ever in his career against As Moon.

He joined BFC Dynamo Berlin at the end of 2000.

Achievements

-Top Scorer of the Second Division Championship North West Region (1995)
-Oberliga Meister 2000/01(Germany)
-Wertvollster spieler (Most Valuable Player) Mitte Cup in Berlin 2003 (Germany)
-Liga Leumi (Second division) runners up 2008/09 (Israel)
-Kolmonen champions and promotion to Kakkonen 2011 (Finland)

References

1979 births
Living people
Cameroonian footballers
Odra Opole players
Berliner FC Dynamo players
Mławianka Mława players
Hapoel Acre F.C. players
Liga Leumit players
Israeli Premier League players
Expatriate footballers in Israel
Expatriate footballers in Poland
Cameroonian expatriate sportspeople in Israel
Cameroonian expatriate sportspeople in Poland
Expatriate footballers in Germany
Cameroonian expatriate sportspeople in Germany
Association football forwards